Beneath the Waves may refer to:

Film and TV
Beneath the Waves by director Renee Marie Freya Tingley

Music
Annwyn, Beneath the Waves, album

Songs
Beneath the Waves (Ayreon song)
"Beneath the Waves", song by Battlelore from The Last Alliance (album) Evernight (album)
"Beneath the Waves", song by Future of the Left The Plot Against Common Sense
"Beneath the Waves", song by Young Guns (band) from All Our Kings Are Dead